Cotoner is a surname. Notable people with the surname include:

Antonio Cotoner y Vallobar, was appointed Nuncio, or extraordinary Ambassador of the Studium generale of Majorca to Philip's II Royal court in Madrid
Bernado Luis Cotoner y Ballester (1571–1641), was Member of the Dominican Order, he came to be Apostolic Inquisitor of the Kingdom of Sardinia,
Fernando Cotoner y Chacón (1817–1888), was 1st marqués de la Cenia, Lieutenant at the Carlist Wars, Governor of Puerto Rico 
Marcos Antonio Cotoner y Sureda (1665–1749), was a Spanish noble, politician and military
Nicolas Cotoner (1608–1680), was the 61st Prince and Grand Master of the Order of Malta
Nicolás Cotoner, 23rd Marquess of Mondéjar (1905–1996),  Spanish nobleman and military officer
Raphael Cotoner (1601–1663), was the 60th Grand Master of the Knights Hospitaller

See also 
House of Cotoner, is a noble house distinguished in the service of the Spanish Monarchy